Nesrine Hamza (born 23 October 1993) is a Tunisian handball player for ASF Mahdia and the Tunisian national team.

She participated at the 2015 World Women's Handball Championship.

References

1993 births
Living people
Tunisian female handball players